Def or DEF may refer to:

Music
 Def (instrument), a Middle Eastern musical instrument
DEF II, a British youth TV programme
Def American, a rock and rap record label
Def Jam Recordings, a rap record label
Def Jux, a rap record label
Def Leppard, a British hard rock band
So So Def Recordings, a rap record label

Other uses
 def, a keyword in Python and PostScript
 Danish EL-Federation, Danish trade union for electricians
 Design Exchange Format, or DEF
 , or DEF, Oskar Schindler's Enamel Factory in Kraków, Poland
 Diesel exhaust fluid, or DEF
 Disarmed Enemy Forces, or DEF

People with the name
Mos Def, a rap artist
Def Jef, a rap artist

See also

Defcon (disambiguation)
Deaf (disambiguation)